Roxana, also known as Rock Springs,  is an unincorporated community northwesterly located in Lee County, Alabama, United States.  It lies seven miles (12 km) north of Notasulga and five miles (8 km) southwest of Waverly. It is part of the Columbus, Georgia-Alabama Metropolitan Area.

History
Roxana was originally named Rock Springs. Since there was already a Rock Springs post office registered in Alabama, Samuel A. Burns, the first postmaster, devised a new name. He combined "rocks" and "Anna", the name of his wife, to come up with Roxana.
A post office operated under the name Roxana from 1882 to 1908.

References

Unincorporated communities in Alabama
Unincorporated communities in Lee County, Alabama
Columbus metropolitan area, Georgia